Châu Thành is a rural district (huyện) of Trà Vinh province in the Mekong Delta region of Vietnam. , the district had a population of 140,438. The district covers an area of 339 km². The district capital lies at Châu Thành.

References

Districts of Trà Vinh province